As the tenth-largest country in the world, and the largest in Africa and in the Mediterranean region, Algeria has a vast transportation system that includes a large and diverse transportation infrastructure.

Railways 

 

SNTF operates the railways, whilst a new, separate organisation, Anesrif, has been created to manage infrastructure investment.

The High Plateau line is a major new project to build an east-west line across the country, parallel to the Rocade Nord.

Timeline

2009 
 A 690-km line from Béchar to Oran is opened on 15 July.
 Planning starts on suburban electrification at 25 kV AC.

2006 
 A new  railway currently under construction from Tébessa to Aïn M'Lila. The  Algiers bypass line between Djasr Kasentina and Oued Smar is also being upgraded.
 18 May 2006 SNTF is to spend $US5 billion (about R30bn) in the next five years on improvements. It has awarded a 39-month-duration contract worth €248.3 million to a joint Algerian and Spanish consortium that will double the Annaba-Ramdane Djamal portion of the  Algiers-Annaba line and upgrade the track for 1 operation.
 SNTF is to electrify  of the route west of Annaba at 25 kV AC, including the branches from Ramdane Djamel to Skikda and Beni Mansour to Bejaia, as well as the line from Khemis Miliana to Oran.
 18 May 2006 - By early 2009, it is hoped to open the first  section of the new light rail line in Algeria's capital city, linking Carl du Ruisseau to Bordj El Kiffan.
 Under construction: there are 3 projects to build tramway networks in 3 major cities: Alger, Oran and Constantine (planned opening 2010).
  CAF is to supply 17 non-tilting diesel multiple-units based on the Renfe Series 598 tilting trains.

Metro

The Algiers Metro is rapid transit system that was first opened in 2011, making Algiers the first city in the Maghreb to possess this type of infrastructure.

Tramways
Algeria possesses one of the highest numbers of tram systems among developing countries, and by far the highest number in Africa, with 7 operating systems across different major cities. Currently the cities of Algiers, Oran, Constantine, Setif, Sidi bel Abbes, Mostaganem and Ouargla have a tram line in operation. The government, wanting to diversify the country's future in rail transport, has assigned the Entreprise Métro d'Alger to the projects.

 Algiers tramway (2011)
 Oran Tramway (2013) 18.7 kilometres (11.6 mi) of route and 32 stops.
 Constantine tramway (2013)  of route and 21 stops. 
Sidi Bel Abbès tramway (June 2017) 13.74 kilometres (8.54 mi) of route and 22 stops.
 Ouargala tramway (March 2018)  of route and 16 stops.
 Setif tramway (May 2018) 22.4 kilometres (13.9 mi) of route and 26 stops.
  (2022)  kilometers of route and 24 stops.

Highways 

Due to extensive investment the motorway network in Algeria is expanding increasingly, along with other kinds of infrastructure. The country plans to link all of its major ports and cities with its highway network, as well as linking the country to all of its neighbors, with the aim of boosting economic activity and trade. 

Regional highways
Algeria has two major roads in the Trans-African Highway network, including the Trans-Sahara Highway, which traverses the country from north to south, and eventually continues into Niger and Nigeria, linking Algiers to Lagos, Nigeria. The country has also constructed the East-West highway, which crosses the entirety of the country's north along the east-west axis, and runs from its border with Tunisia to that with Morocco, connecting most major Algerian cities in the process.

Motorways
East-West Highway. This is the most important road infrastructure in the country, it is a six-lane expressway that extends all the way from Ain El Assel, on the border with Tunisia to Maghnia, on the border with Morocco, over the length of 1,216 km. The highway links several major cities of the country along its way, namely Constantine, Sétif, Algiers, Blida, Chlef, Sidi Bel Abbes and Tlemcen, with additional secondary expressways constructed to link other major cities to it, such as Oran, Béjaïa, Tizi Ouzou, Jijel, Skikda, Mostaghanem and Batna. 
Highway of the Hauts Plateaux is a planned highway of 1020 km that runs in parallel to the East–West Highway through the steppe-like region of the Hautes Plaines. The highways extends from the province of Tlemcen on the border with Morocco, through Saida, Tiaret, Medea, M'sila, Batna, Oum El Bouaghi, Khenchela and finally ending at Tebessa on the border with Tunisia. Construction began on some sections of the highway. 
National Highway 4. Extends from Oran to Boufarik, total length: 384 km.  It is a motorway on its extent from Oran to Zaghloul (Zahana), length: 35 km.
National Highway 5. It is a motorway on its extent from Dar El Beïda to Ammal. Length: 82 km.
National Highway 11. It is a motorway running from Alger to Cherchell. Length:  65 km.
National Highway 12. It is a motorway running from Si Mustapha to Tizi Ouzou. Length: 57 km.

Cable transport
Due to its mountainous geography, Algeria has taken a particular interest in cable-based transportation, namely gondola lifts and aerial tramways, which serve as both an ecological and touristic means of transport. Currently there are seven such systems in operation across the country, in Algiers, Tlemcen, Tizi Ouzou, Chréa, Constantine, Annaba and Skikda. 

Over the coming years, Algeria will be endowed with a program of new projects for the modernization and maintenance of all the country's cable cars. These works aim to reinforce the country's public cable transport.

Pipelines 

As of 2013 Algeria had an extensive network of pipelines, with 7036 kilometers of oil pipelines, 16415 kilometers of natural gas pipelines, 3447 kilometers of liquid petroleum gas pipelines, 2600 kilometers of condensate pipelines and 144 kilometers of refined products pipelines. 

The country has 3 exportation pipelines, two running to Spain (Maghreb-Europe Gas Pipeline and Medgaz), and one running to Italy (Trans-Mediterranean Pipeline), with an additional pipeline (GALSI) planned between Annaba and Sardinia. The pipeline networks will be extended to France and Germany.

Ports and harbors

Mediterranean Sea 
 Algiers, Annaba, Arzew, Bejaia, Béni Saf, Dellys, Djendjen, Ghazaouet, Jijel, Mostaganem, Oran, Skikda, and Ténès

Merchant marine 
Total: 110 (2017, CIA World Factbook)
by type: bulk carrier 3, general cargo 13, oil tanker 9, other 85 (2017)

Airports

See also
 Algeria

References